Sun Chui Estate is a public housing estate in Tai Wai, New Territories, Hong Kong near Lung Hang Estate, Che Kung Temple and MTR Tai Wai station. It consists of eight residential buildings completed in 1983, 1984 and 1985 respectively.

Background
The estate was formerly known as Sun Tin Estate. However, in November 1981, it was renamed as Sun Chui Estate.

Houses

Demographics
According to the 2016 by-census, Sun Chui Estate had a population of 17,475. The median age was 50.3 and the majority of residents (97.8 per cent) were of Chinese ethnicity. The average household size was 2.7 people. The median monthly household income of all households (i.e. including both economically active and inactive households) was HK$20,290.

Politics
For the 2019 District Council election, the estate fell within two constituencies. Most of the estate is located in the Chui Ka constituency, which is represented by Li Sai-hung, while the remainder of the estate falls within the Chui Tin constituency, which is represented by Rick Hui Yui-yu.

See also

Public housing estates in Tai Wai

References

Residential buildings completed in 1983
Residential buildings completed in 1984
Residential buildings completed in 1985
Tai Wai
Public housing estates in Hong Kong